Emiliano Morlans (born 11 September 1952) is a Spanish cross-country skier. He competed in the men's 15 kilometre event at the 1980 Winter Olympics.

References

1952 births
Living people
Spanish male cross-country skiers
Olympic cross-country skiers of Spain
Cross-country skiers at the 1980 Winter Olympics
Place of birth missing (living people)